Yarisel Ramirez is an American Featherweight boxer.

References

1999 births
Living people
American women boxers
Boxers at the 2019 Pan American Games
Pan American Games bronze medalists for the United States
Pan American Games medalists in boxing
Medalists at the 2019 Pan American Games
Olympic boxers of the United States
Boxers at the 2020 Summer Olympics
21st-century American women